"I Was Wrong" is a 2013 song by Celeste Buckingham and Majk Spirit, released through iTunes on May 6, 2013. Following the initial collaboration of both Slovak recording artists for a song called "Ja a ty" from 2012, their second duet was produced by Andrej Hruška and Martin Šrámek of Littlebeat studio.

The song charted at number two on the SK Top 100 topping the component airplay chart, respectively. In the Czech Republic, it reached at number seventeen on the CZ Top 100, while at number two on the CZ Hot 50. The music video directed by Jiří Marshal was shot in California, USA.

Credits and personnel
 Celeste Buckingham - lead vocalist, writer, lyrics (in English)
 Majk Spirit - backing vocalist, lyrics (in Slovak)
 Martin Šrámek - writer, producer, programmer
 Andrej Hruška - post-production, programmer
 Filip Hittrich - post-production, programmer
 Matej Mikloš - piano
 Ľuboš Priehradník - mastering
 Littlebeat - recording studio
 Spirit MBA - record label, distributor

Track listings
 "I Was Wrong" (Original version) — 3:58

Charts

References
General

Specific

External links
 Express.sk > "I Was Wrong" (Pre-release on Rádio Expres)

2013 songs
Celeste Buckingham songs
Songs written by Celeste Buckingham
2013 singles